The Journal of Stroke & Cerebrovascular Diseases is a bimonthly peer-reviewed medical journal covering the study of stroke and other cerebrovascular diseases. It was established in 1991 and is published by Elsevier on behalf of the National Stroke Association and the Japan Stroke Society, of which it is the official journal. The editor-in-chief is Fernando D Testai (University of Illinois Chicago). According to the journal's website, it has a 2021 impact factor of 2.677.

References

External links

Publications established in 1991
Bimonthly journals
Cardiology journals
Elsevier academic journals
English-language journals
Academic journals associated with learned and professional societies of the United States
Stroke